Gross or Groß in German is the correct spelling of the surname under German orthographic rules. In Switzerland, the name is spelled Gross. Some Germans and Austrians also use the spelling with "ss" instead of "ß".

It is a surname of German, Prussian, and Yiddish (Ashkenazi Jewish) origin. The word means "big", "tall" or "great", and was likely adopted in Europe over the 15th to 19th centuries during the times of the House of Habsburg when monarchs of the royal families (Emperor or Empress) were called "the Great" (der Große). Descendants of this House may have adopted the name Gross from their ancestors. 

German-speaking Christian hymns use references to Jesus as "Mein Herr ist Groß" (My Lord is Great) or "So Groß ist der Herr" (So Great is the Lord). Composer Franz Schubert (1797-1828) wrote several songs referring to Jesus or God as groß, such as D 757,  a quartet called "Gott in der Natur" (Groß ist der Herr!) in 1822 and D 852, "Die Allmacht" (Groß ist Jehova, der Herr) in 1825.

People with this surname

 Al Gross (politician), American politician and United States senate candidate
 Alfred J. Gross (1918–2000), American inventor
 Arye Gross (born 1960), American actor
 Avrum Gross (1936–2018), American lawyer
 Benedict Gross (born 1950), American mathematician
 Bill Gross (born 1958), American businessman
 Chaim Gross (1904–1991), sculptor born in Galicia 
 Charles Gross (born 1934), American composer
 Charles P. Gross (1889–1975), United States Army officer
 Christian Gross (born 1954), Swiss football manager
 David Gross (born 1941), American scientist and Nobel prize winner
 David A. Gross (born 1954), American diplomat
 Evgeni Gross (1897–1972), Soviet scientist
 Frank Gross (1919–2006), Canadian philanthropist
 Gabe Gross (born 1979), American baseball player
 Garry Gross, American photographer
 H. R. Gross (1899–1987), American politician
 Hans Georg Friedrich Groß (1860–1924), a German Empire balloonist and airship constructor
 Hans Gross (Groß, Grosz) (1847–1915) Austrian lawyer, one of the earliest modern forensic scientists
 Heinrich Gross (1915–2005), Austrian Nazi doctor
 Heinrich Gross (rabbi) (1835–1910), German rabbi
 Helen Gross (1896–unknown), American classic female blues singer
 Henry Gross (born 1951), American singer-songwriter
 Herbert Gross (born 1929), American mathematician
 Izidor Gross (1866–1942), Croatian chess master and hazzan
 Jacob Gross (Illinois politician) (1840–1918), Illinois state treasurer
 Jacob Gross (piano maker) (1819–1899), German-American piano maker
 Jacob A. Gross (born 1842), New York politician
 James A. Gross, American professor and labor law expert
 James Gross, American psychologist and professor
 Jan T. Gross (born 1947), Polish-American historian
 John Gross (1935–2011), British author, editor and critic
 Jordan Gross (born 1980), American football player
 Jost Gross (1946–2005), Swiss politician
 Julie Gross (born 1957), Australian basketball player
 Kenneth I. Gross (born 1938), American mathematician
 Kevin Gross (born 1961), American baseball player
 Kip Gross (born 1964), American baseball player
 Larry Gross, American screenwriter
 Luke Gross (born 1969), American rugby footballer
 M. Louise Gross (1884–1951), American activist
 Manuela Groß (born 1957), German figure skater
 Mark Gross (musician) (born 1966), American musician
 Mark Gross (mathematician) (born 1965), American mathematician
 Mary Gross (born 1953), American actress, voice actress, and comedian
 Mason W. Gross (1911–1977), American university president
 Matthias Gross (born 1969), German social scientist
 Maurice Gross (1934–2001), French linguist
 Michael Gross (disambiguation), multiple people
 Michael Groß (politician), German politician
 Michael Groß (swimmer), German swimmer
 Milt Gross (1895–1953), American comics artist
 Miriam Gross (born 1939), British editor, journalist and writer
 Mirjana Gross (1922–2012), Croatian historian and writer
 Morris Gross, American college sports coach
 Nikolaus Gross (1898–1945), German anti-Nazi activist
 Otto Gross (1877–1920), Austrian psychoanalyst
 Pascal Groß (born 1991), German footballer
 Paul Gross (born 1959), Canadian actor
 Pete Gross, American sports announcer
 Philip Gross (born 1952), English poet
 Ricco Groß (born 1970), German retired biathlete
 Rita Gross (1943–2015), American educator, writer, and theologian
 Robert A. Gross (historian) (born 1959), American historian and professor
 Robert E. Gross (businessman) (1897–1961), American businessman
 Robert Edward Gross (1905–1988), American pioneering pediatric surgeon
 Roland Gross (1909–1989), American film editor
 Sam Gross, American cartoonist
 Samuel David Gross (1805–1884), American surgeon
 Sara Gross (born 1976), Canada-born British triathlete
 Stanislav Gross (1969–2015), Czech lawyer, politician and former social-democratic Prime Minister
 Susanna Gross, English newspaper editor
 Terry Gross (born 1951), American radio personality
 Tom Gross, journalist and political commentator
 Walter Gross (disambiguation), multiple people
 William H. Gross (born 1944), American financial manager and author
 Yoram Gross (1926–2015), Polish–Australian film producer
 Dr Gröss, a character in Faces of Death and its sequels. It can also refer to Heinrich Gross

See also 
 List of people known as "the Great"
 Goss (surname)
 Gosse
 Gros (disambiguation)
 Grosz (disambiguation)
 Kross (disambiguation)

German-language surnames
Jewish surnames
Yiddish-language_surnames